SM U-25 was one of the 329 submarines serving in the Imperial German Navy in World War I.
 
U-25 was engaged in the naval warfare and took part in the First Battle of the Atlantic.

Summary of raiding history

References

Notes

Citations

Bibliography

World War I submarines of Germany
1913 ships
Ships built in Kiel
U-boats commissioned in 1914
Type U 23 submarines